LA 92 is a 2017 American documentary film about the 1992 Los Angeles riots, directed by Daniel Lindsay and T. J. Martin. It premiered at the Tribeca Film Festival on April 21, 2017, opened in theaters on April 28, 2017 and aired on National Geographic Channel on April 30, 2017.

Synopsis
Consisting entirely of archival footage, the documentary chronicles the 1992 Los Angeles riots after 25 years have passed.

It includes film and video from the 1965 Watts Riots, the 1973 election of Tom Bradley, the 1978 promotion of Daryl Gates, the shooting of Latasha Harlins, the Rodney King videotape and the subsequent riots and violence that erupted after the acquittal of the officers involved in King's beating.

The footage includes public pronouncements by U.S. President George H. W. Bush, presidential candidate Bill Clinton, California governor Pete Wilson, chief of the Los Angeles Police Department Daryl Gates (questioned by the LA city council at one point), judge Joyce Karlin, US Congresswoman Maxine Waters, victim Rodney King, and acquitted police officers Stacey Koon and Laurence Powell.

Reception
On Rotten Tomatoes, the film has an approval rating of 97%, based on 29 reviews, with an average rating of 7.53/10.

Accolades
The film won the Primetime Emmy Award for Exceptional Merit in Documentary Filmmaking, beating out Oscar winners O.J.: Made in America and The White Helmets among others.

See also
Let It Fall: Los Angeles 1982–1992
Culture of Los Angeles
Undefeated – 2011 Oscar-winning film directed by Lindsay and Martin
1992 in television

References

External links
 Official website
 
 
 

2017 films
2017 documentary films
American documentary films
Collage film
Documentary films about race and ethnicity in the United States
Documentary films about African Americans
Documentary films about Asian Americans
Films set in 1992
Documentary films about Los Angeles
Films set in the 1990s
National Geographic (American TV channel) original programming
1992 Los Angeles riots
Collage television
Television Academy Honors winners
Primetime Emmy Award-winning broadcasts
2010s English-language films
2010s American films